The Italian ambassador in Valletta is the official representative of the Government in Rome to the Government of Malta.

List of representatives
<onlyinclude>

References 

 
Malta
Italy